Shaun LeJon Williams (born October 10, 1976 in Oakland, California) is a former American football safety, most recently for the Carolina Panthers, of the National Football League.

Early years
Williams attended Crespi Carmelite High School in Encino, California and played both tailback and safety. He won All-CIF Division I and Del Rey League MVP in his last two seasons of his high school career.

College career
He attended UCLA where he majored in Pre-Psychology. Williams started in three of his four seasons at UCLA. As a junior, started nine games and registered 59 tackles (3rd on the team) and three sacks resulting in All-Pac-10 Honorable Mention. In his senior season, Williams started nine games and recorded two interceptions and nine pass deflections. He also finished second on the team with 68 tackles. Was chosen for the All-Pac-10 Conference First-team.

Professional career
Williams was the 24th pick in 1998 NFL Draft by the New York Giants. In the 1998 and 1999 seasons, he mainly played in the nickel defense and special teams. Williams started every game in the 2000–2002 seasons. In 2003, Williams suffered a season-ending right knee injury in 10th game of the season versus the Philadelphia Eagles. He started two games in the 2004 season before tearing a ligament in his left knee, which forced him to miss the remainder of the season.

In his nine years in the NFL, Williams recorded 335 tackles, 4.5 sacks, 15 interceptions with a total of 130 yards in the returns.

NFL statistics

Post NFL
Williams is the head coach at William Paterson University in New Jersey for their football team, the Pioneers, after spending the last four seasons as their part-time assistant coach.  Williams announced the New York Giants 33rd overall pick for the 2015 NFL Draft  Landon Collins.

References

See also
History of the New York Giants (1994-present)

1976 births
Living people
Players of American football from Oakland, California
American football safeties
UCLA Bruins football players
Carolina Panthers players
New York Giants players
Ed Block Courage Award recipients